Rezare is a hamlet in east Cornwall, England. It is one mile east of Treburley on a minor road from Lewannick to Stoke Climsland.

References

Hamlets in Cornwall